Romylos Kedikoglou is a former president of the Court of Cassation of Greece. He was born in 1940 in Heraklion in Crete. He is married and father of one child. He graduated from the Law Department of the National and Kapodistrian University of Athens with distinction.

References

1940 births
National and Kapodistrian University of Athens alumni
20th-century Greek judges
People from Heraklion
Living people
Presidents of the Supreme Civil and Criminal Court of Greece
21st-century Greek judges